Carlos Palanca (1844–1901), also known as Tan Quien Sien or Chuey Leong, was a Chinese government official and diplomat in the Philippines. During the latter part of the Spanish colonial era in the islands he served as the Chinese captain (capitan chino) and was the acting consul general of Qing China to the Philippines until 1899.

Palanca adopted his name from his godfather, Spanish colonel Carlos Palanca y Gutierrez. He was the gobernadorcillo of the Gremio de Chino. Carlos Palanca helped fund the establishment of the Chinese General Hospital in 1891

In Rizal's Chinese Overcoat, Alfonso Ang asserts that the character Quiroga in Jose Rizal's novel El Filibusterismo  was based on Palanca.

References

1844 births
1901 deaths
Filipino people of Chinese descent
People from Xiamen
19th-century Filipino businesspeople
Filipino diplomats
Qing dynasty diplomats